The Golden Trail may refer to:

 The Golden Trail (1920 film), silent film
 The Golden Trail (1940 film), American film